The Gawambaraay (Kawambarai) are an Aboriginal Australian people of the state of New South Wales, closely connected to the Gamilaraay (Kamilaroi) people. Their traditional lands are in the central–western district of New South Wales

Name
The ethnonym is thought to derive from a language name, kawam being equivalent to guin, and bearing the sense of 'no'. One other word used denoting the tribe, Wirriri also seems to reflect a word for no, namely wir:i

Language

The Gawambaraay or Kawambarai language is a dialect of the Gamilaraay language group.

Country
Their southern extension ran to the vicinity of present-day Dubbo.

People
Richardson affirmed that the Kawambarai were closely connected to the Gamilaroi.

Alternative names

 Cooinburri
 Gawambarai
 Goinberai
 Guinbrai, Guinberai
 Kawarnparai
 Koinbere, Koinberi
 Koinberri
 Mole tribe
 Wirriri
 Wirriwirri
 Wooratherie

Source:

Some words
  (father)
  (mother)
  (whiteman)
  (tame dog)

Notes

Citations

Sources

Aboriginal peoples of New South Wales